Mehndi is 1958 Hindi film produced by A.A. Nadiadwala and directed by S. M. Yusuf. The music for the film was composed by Ravi. The film stars Ajit and Jayashree in lead roles.

Cast
 Ajit 
 Jayashree
 Veena Sapru
 M. Kumar
 Mirza Musharaf
 Balam
 Lalita Pawar
 Krishnakant
 Anwaribai
 Muzaffar Adeeb

Soundtrack
The music of the film was composed by Ravi with lyrics penned by S. H. Bihari, Khumar Barabankvi, Kamil Rashid and Sarvar.

References

External links
 

1958 films
1950s Hindi-language films
Films scored by Ravi
Films based on Indian novels
Films about courtesans in India